Antonín Janoušek (22 August 1877, in Nymburk – 30 March 1941) was a Czech journalist and communist who was the leader of the short-lived Slovak Soviet Republic.

Early life and career 
Originally an engine fitter, in 1895, Janoušek became a member of the Czechoslavonic Social Democratic Workers' Party. In 1906, he became a workers journalists and a functionary of workers associations in Austria-Hungary.

Communist activities 
In 1919, Janoušek led the Czech and Slovak section at the central committee of the Hungarian Communist Party. He was the only “chairman of the revolutionary committee” (predseda revolučného výboru) of the short-lived Slovak Soviet Republic, proclaimed in Prešov on 20 June 1919. The republic was created with military support from the Hungarian Soviet Republic. After the Hungarians were pushed out by troops of the First Czechoslovak Republic following the Hungarian–Czechoslovak War of 1918–1919, the Slovak Soviet Republic ceased to exist on 7 July 1919.

Janoušek was imprisoned by the regime of Miklós Horthy in Hungary in 1920, and was then handed over to Czechoslovak authorities. In 1922, he moved to Soviet Russia, where he became a functionary of the International Workers Aid Council. He lived in Cheboksary, Chuvashia. Janoušek died "in bed" as reported by the historian V. Nálevka.

References
 Příruční slovník naučný 1962 (encyclopedia by Czechoslovak Academy of Sciences): volume II, page 338.

1877 births
1941 deaths
19th-century Czech people
20th-century Czech people
20th-century Slovak people
20th-century Hungarian people
Czech communists
Czech politicians
Czechoslovak politicians
Slovak politicians
Prime Ministers of Slovakia
Hungarian Communist Party politicians
Slovak people of Czech descent
Hungarian people of Czech descent
People from Nymburk
Austro-Hungarian journalists